On 26 September 1983, during the Cold War, the nuclear early-warning radar of the Soviet Union reported the launch of one intercontinental ballistic missile with four more missiles behind it, from bases in the United States. These missile attack warnings were suspected to be false alarms by Stanislav Petrov, an officer of the Soviet Air Defence Forces on duty at the command center of the early-warning system. He decided to wait for corroborating evidence—of which none arrived—rather than immediately relaying the warning up the chain-of-command. This decision is seen as having prevented a retaliatory nuclear attack against the United States and its NATO allies, which would likely have resulted in an escalation to a full-scale nuclear war. Investigation of the satellite warning system later determined that the system had indeed malfunctioned.

Background
The incident occurred at a time of severely strained relations between the United States and the Soviet Union. Responding to the Soviet Union's deployment of fourteen SS-20/RSD-10 theatre nuclear missiles, the NATO Double-Track Decision was taken in December 1979 by the military commander of NATO to deploy 108 Pershing II nuclear missiles in Western Europe with the ability to hit targets in eastern Ukraine, Byelorussia or Lithuania within 10 minutes and the longer range, but slower BGM-109G Ground Launched Cruise Missile (GLCM) to strike potential targets farther to the east. In mid-February 1981, and continuing until 1983, psychological operations by the United States began. These were designed to test Soviet radar vulnerability and to demonstrate US nuclear capabilities. They included clandestine naval operations in the Barents, Norwegian, Black and Baltic seas and near the GIUK gap, as well as flights by American bombers, occasionally several times per week, directly toward Soviet airspace that turned away only at the last moment. 

From the accounts of CIA and senior KGB officers, by May 1981, obsessed with historical parallels with the 1941 German invasion and Reaganite rhetoric, and with no defensive capability against the Pershing IIs, Soviet leaders believed the United States was preparing a secret nuclear attack on the USSR and initiated Operation RYaN. Under this, agents abroad monitored service and technical personnel who would implement a nuclear attack so as to be able either to preempt it or have mutually assured destruction.

On 1 September 1983, the Soviet military shot down a South Korean passenger jet, Korean Air Lines Flight 007, that had strayed into Soviet airspace. All 269 people aboard the aircraft were killed, including U.S. Representative Larry McDonald and many other Americans. The first Pershing II missiles were delivered to West Germany on 1 December 1983.

Bruce G. Blair, an expert on Cold War nuclear strategies and former president of the World Security Institute in Washington, D.C., says the American–Soviet relationship at that time:

In an interview aired on American television, Blair said, "The Russians (Soviets) saw a U.S. government preparing for a first strike, headed by a President Ronald Reagan capable of ordering a first strike." Regarding the incident involving Petrov, he said, "I think that this is the closest our country has come to accidental nuclear war."

Incident 
On 26 September 1983, Stanislav Petrov, a lieutenant colonel in the Soviet Air Defense Forces, was the officer on duty at the Serpukhov-15 bunker near Moscow which housed the command center of the Soviet early warning satellites, code-named Oko. Petrov's responsibilities included observing the satellite early-warning network and notifying his superiors of any impending nuclear missile attack against the Soviet Union. If notification was received from the early-warning systems that inbound missiles had been detected, the Soviet Union's strategy was an immediate and compulsory nuclear counter-attack against the United States (launch on warning), specified in the doctrine of mutual assured destruction.

Shortly after midnight, the bunker's computers reported that one intercontinental ballistic missile was heading toward the Soviet Union from the United States. Petrov considered the detection a computer error, since a first-strike nuclear attack by the United States was likely to involve hundreds of simultaneous missile launches in order to disable any Soviet means of a counterattack. Furthermore, the satellite system's reliability had been questioned in the past. Petrov dismissed the warning as a false alarm, though accounts of the event differ as to whether he notified his superiors or not after he concluded that the computer detections were false and that no missile had been launched. Petrov's suspicion that the warning system was malfunctioning was confirmed when no missile in fact arrived. Later, the computers identified four additional missiles in the air, all directed towards the Soviet Union. Petrov suspected that the computer system was malfunctioning again, despite having no direct means to confirm this. The Soviet Union's land radar was incapable of detecting missiles beyond the horizon. 

It was subsequently determined that the false alarms were caused by a rare alignment of sunlight on high-altitude clouds and the satellites' Molniya orbits, an error later corrected by cross-referencing a geostationary satellite.

In explaining the factors leading to his decision, Petrov cited his belief and training that any U.S. first strike would be massive, so five missiles seemed an illogical start. In addition, the launch detection system was new and in his view not yet wholly trustworthy, while ground radar had failed to pick up corroborative evidence even after several minutes of the false alarm.

Aftermath 

Petrov underwent intense questioning by his superiors about his actions. Initially, he was praised for his decision. General Yuri Votintsev, then commander of the Soviet Air Defense's Missile Defense Units, who was the first to hear Petrov's report of the incident (and the first to reveal it to the public in 1998), stated that Petrov's "correct actions" were "duly noted." Petrov himself stated he was initially praised by Votintsev and was promised a reward, but recalled that he was also reprimanded for improper filing of paperwork with the pretext that he had not described the incident in the military diary.

He received no reward. According to Petrov, this was because the incident and other bugs found in the missile detection system embarrassed his superiors and the influential scientists who were responsible for it, so that if he had been officially rewarded, they would have had to be punished. He was reassigned to a less sensitive post, took early retirement (although he emphasized that he was not "forced out" of the army, as is sometimes claimed by Western sources), and suffered a nervous breakdown.

Oleg Kalugin, a former KGB chief of foreign counter-intelligence who knew Soviet leader Yuri Andropov well, said that Andropov's distrust of American leaders was profound. It was conceivable that if Petrov had declared the satellite warnings valid, such an erroneous report could have provoked the Soviet leadership into becoming bellicose. Kalugin said: "The danger was in the Soviet leadership thinking, 'The Americans may attack, so we better attack first.

See also 
 1961 Goldsboro B-52 crash – another nuclear accident which narrowly missed widespread destruction
 2018 Hawaii false missile alert – an incident where a false ballistic missile alert was issued to civilians in the US State of Hawaii
 Able Archer 83 – NATO military exercise that happened over a month after the Petrov incident
 Dead Hand – nuclear weapons-control system used to automatically launch Russian intercontinental ballistic missiles if a nuclear strike is detected, even with the commanding elements fully destroyed
 Deutschland 83
 List of nuclear close calls
 Norwegian rocket incident – a rocket carrying scientific equipment to study the aurora borealis resembled a submarine-launched Trident missile
 Vasily Arkhipov – the subject of another nuclear war-averting incident during the Cuban Missile Crisis
 WarGames – a 1983 film released four months prior to the incident, depicting an early warning system's false alarm of a thermonuclear strike
 World War III – situations resulting in close encounters of a third world war

References

External links 
 BrightStarSound.com Stanislav Petrov tribute website, multiple pages with photos and reprints of various articles about Petrov
 Nuclear War: Minuteman Article from Weekendavisen, 2 April 2004.
 The Nuclear War that Almost Happened in 1983 (posted September 5, 2003). History News Network, Originally in the Baltimore Sun of 31 August 2003
 Armageddon Almost Not Averted
 "Sept. 26, 1983: The Man Who Saved the World by Doing ... Nothing".
 30 years on: The day a computer glitch nearly caused World War III. The Register. 27 September 2013

Cold War military history of the Soviet Union
1983 in the Soviet Union
Soviet Union–United States relations
Early warning systems
Nuclear command and control
Computer errors
1983 controversies
September 1983 events in Europe
War scare